Martina Navratilova and Pam Shriver were the defending champions, but lost in the quarterfinals to Svetlana Parkhomenko and Larisa Savchenko.

Claudia Kohde-Kilsch and Helena Suková defeated Betsy Nagelsen and Elizabeth Smylie in the final, 7-5, 7-5 to win the ladies' doubles tennis title at the 1987 Wimbledon Championships.

Seeds

  Martina Navratilova /  Pam Shriver (quarterfinals)
  Steffi Graf /  Gabriela Sabatini (third round)
  Claudia Kohde-Kilsch /  Helena Suková (champions)
  Elise Burgin /  Rosalyn Fairbank (quarterfinals)
  Betsy Nagelsen /  Elizabeth Smylie (final)
  Svetlana Parkhomenko /  Larisa Savchenko (semifinals)
  Lori McNeil /  Robin White (semifinals)
  Bettina Bunge /  Gigi Fernández (third round)
  Kathy Jordan /  Anne Smith (quarterfinals)
  Mercedes Paz /  Eva Pfaff (first round)
  Anne Hobbs /  Candy Reynolds (third round)
  Mary-Lou Piatek /  Anne White (second round)
  Jenny Byrne /  Patty Fendick (second round)
  Catarina Lindqvist /  Tine Scheuer-Larsen (first round)
  Beth Herr /  Alycia Moulton (second round)
  Jo Durie /  Catherine Tanvier (first round)

Qualifying

Draw

Finals

Top half

Section 1

Section 2

Bottom half

Section 3

Section 4

References

External links

1987 Wimbledon Championships – Women's draws and results at the International Tennis Federation

Women's Doubles
Wimbledon Championship by year – Women's doubles
Wimbledon Championships
Wimbledon Championships